Lesser known temples built by the Hoysala Empire during the period of their ascendancy (1119-1286 C.E.) are included in the table below. These constructions incorporate many of the artistic features usually associated with Hoysala architecture.

References
Citations

Bibliography

 
 
 
 

Hindu temples in Karnataka